Sonia Smith (born 19 September 1962) is a Bermudian athlete. She competed in the women's javelin throw at the 1984 Summer Olympics.

References

1962 births
Living people
Athletes (track and field) at the 1978 Commonwealth Games
Athletes (track and field) at the 1984 Summer Olympics
Bermudian female javelin throwers
Olympic athletes of Bermuda
Commonwealth Games competitors for Bermuda
Athletes (track and field) at the 1979 Pan American Games
Pan American Games competitors for Bermuda
Place of birth missing (living people)